Bradina xanthalis is a moth in the family Crambidae. It was described by George Hampson in 1917. It is found in Papua New Guinea, where it has been recorded from the Louisiade Islands.

References

Moths described in 1917
Bradina